Friedrich Gottlieb Süskind (February 17, 1767 – November 12, 1829) was a German Protestant theologian born in Neuenstadt am Kocher.

In 1783 he began his theological studies at the Protestant seminar in Tübingen, later embarking on an extensive journey throughout Germany (1790). Afterwards, he served as "pastor repentant" at Tübinger Stift, followed by a vicariate in Stuttgart (1795). From 1795 to 1798 he served as a Diakonus (deacon) in Urach. In 1798 he became an associate professor at the University of Tübingen, and in 1805 returned to Stuttgart, where he was appointed Oberhofprediger and Konsistorialrat. In 1809 he was involved in the liturgical reorganization in Württemberg.

Süskind was a disciple of Gottlob Christian Storr (1746–1805), and a prominent member of the so-called Ältere Tübinger Schule (conservative Tübingen theologians). Within this group he excelled in the field of dialectics. His work was primarily directed to the apologetic and dogmatic fundamental questions of Christianity. During his career, he was in constant conflict with proponents of Kantian and Fichtean philosophies.

With Johann Friedrich Flatt (1759-1821), he was editor of the "Magazin für christliche Dogmatik und Moral" (Magazine for Christian Dogmatics and Morals).

Selected publications 
 Über das Recht der Vernunft in Ansehung der negativen Bestimmung der Offenbarung (About the right of reason in view of the negative determination of revelation), (1797).
 In welchem Sinne hat Jesus die Göttlichkeit seiner Religions- und Sittenlehre behauptet? (In what sense has Jesus the divinity of religious and moral claims?), (1802). 
 Über die Pestalozzische Methode und ihre Einführung in die Volksschulen (About the Pestalozzi Method and its introduction into elementary schools), (1810).

References 
  English translation

1767 births
1829 deaths
People from Neuenstadt am Kocher
19th-century German Protestant theologians
Academic staff of the University of Tübingen
19th-century German male writers
German male non-fiction writers